The Things You See is a collaborative studio album by guitarist Allan Holdsworth and pianist Gordon Beck, released in 1980 through JMS–Cream Records. Both The Things You See and Beck's 1979 album Sunbird were reissued together as a compilation in 1989 (with the omission of "Flight" from Sunbird) and again in 1994 (including "Flight"). Holdsworth and Beck would later collaborate again on With a Heart in My Song in 1988.

The album's title was explained by Holdsworth on his 1992 instructional video: "The title for this tune came from me kind of... falling out of a pub one night back in England. There was this old guy walking down the street, and I guess he must have seen all of us hooligans coming out of the pub. He just looked at us and said, 'Boy, the things you see when you haven't got your gun!'"

"At the Edge" also features a rare instance of Holdsworth singing; the song would later be revamped and renamed "The Things You See (When You Haven't Got Your Gun)" on his 1982 album I.O.U., with Paul Williams on vocals.

Critical reception

Scott Yanow at AllMusic gave The Things You See three stars out of five, noting that "the overall music is not as memorable as one would hope". However, despite saying that it was not a classic, he nonetheless deemed it of interest to Holdsworth fans curious to hear him in a different context than usual.

Track listing

Personnel
Allan Holdsworth – vocals, guitar, electric violin
Gordon Beck – Rhodes piano, piano
Jean-Marie Salhani – production

References

Allan Holdsworth albums
Gordon Beck albums
1980 albums